Lazzaro Donati (January 8, 1926  - 1977) was born in Florence and attended the Academy of Fine Arts. He began to paint in 1953, and in 1955 held his first exhibition at the Indiano Gallery in Florence. Within three years eleven exhibitions followed in Italy, and as his reputation grew he was invited to give major exhibitions in London, Paris, New York, Chicago, Rio de Janeiro and Montevideo. He is considered one of the foremost contemporary Italian painters and his paintings hang in museums and private collections throughout the Americas, Europe and Asia.

Studio 
Donati lived and worked at 24 Piazza Donatello in Florence, the square where generations of artists have created works worthy of the great Florentine tradition. As you entered the narrow hallway to his studio, a gilded life-size Venetian angel beckoned you to his door. Once inside, the present faded away and you found yourself in an atelier where early masters might have worked during the Renaissance. Within, luxurious Persian rugs set off the innumerable objects d’art and antique furnishings. Light poured in through the sloping glass wall on the north side. A dramatic stairway led to an overhanging balcony which served as a private gallery where the artist hung some of his favorite early works. To the left of the entrance was a smaller studio where Donati sculpted, with a window overlooking the famous old English cemetery where tourists laid flowers on the grave of Elizabeth Barrett Browning.

In the main studio itself, where Donati received his clients in an atmosphere as polished as an office of a top executive, one hardly realized that it was here that the artist actually painted. His easel was covered with Persian blue velvet, the painting on the easel was already framed, his chair was upholstered in red velvet and on his palette the colors were arranged with the precision of a Byzantine mosaic. In a corner stand were his latest works, framed and ready to be sent off to his next exhibition in Europe or America.

Donati was a born host with a warm welcome, an elegant man who possessed enormous charm a good nature and a keen sense of humor. Apparently shy, he preferred to speak on subjects extraneous to his art, purposely distracting you from his paintings, then leading you back to them, tactfully and without pretension. He spoke fluent French and English as well as some Spanish and German. “After all”, he said, “you've got to know how to sell a painting to everyone.”

Style 

He had no sympathy for the “drip and splash” studios of his contemporaries, preferring to keep his studio tidy and spotless. “Painting is a matter of precision”, he said, “If a painter can’t put his paint where he wants it to go, I don’t see how he can call himself a painter. For me it is absolutely necessary to control the paint.”

When asked to reveal the technique he used to achieve the enamel-like finish typical of his paintings he answered, “That is a secret between me and my butler. Actually, most of my paintings are done by him!” But in fact behind the façade, Donati was a serious craftsman who devoted to his painting as a way of life and means of expression. From the beginning of his career, his paintings revealed a striving for perfection and continual research in problems of style and technique. His early works indicated a momentary interest in surrealism and abstract art; they were predominantly two dimensional, depending on line and strong color. But by 1958, with his painting The Lady with a Fan, a work which he had hung in a place of honor on his balcony, came a dedicated change of style. There was a new interest in volume, and a particular taste for curved forms. By this time, Donati was already well on his way to evolving his own highly personal form of expression, which owed little to any of the major schools of contemporary painting.
His procedure in building up the painting was unusual. Only for his earliest works did Donati use canvas. He painted almost exclusively on specially treated wood panels. With the panel laid flat on the table, he first laid in the background with the rich, translucent glazes which gave the characteristic finish to his work. This “background” may perhaps be better described as the atmosphere in which his subjects existed, or out of which they eventually emerged.

He then sketched in the forms of the composition using a special crayon. A minimum of line served to evoke a sense of volume, figures and background interpenetrated. He then returned to his paints, integrating varied techniques to achieve his brilliant chromatic and textural effects. The volumes are defined and the planes of the composition established. Finally, he completed his work with what he calls “lumi”, and archaic Italian word meaning “lights”, feathery touches of pure color which served to accentuate the sense of volume. Donati summed up his artistic intentions in this manner: “I am trying to use the experience of abstract art, superimposing a drawing in the round, and then adding to it points of light to give added volume. What I try to do is to use the system of the Renaissance with modern touches.” This is the interesting point: that Donati imposed his subjects on and out of abstractionism.

Perhaps Donati's most remarkable ability is his mastery of color. In his studio he had four palettes. Two were in use on his working table, one for earth colors and one for the high tones. Hanging behind the easel were two more, each with a kaleidoscope of colors. When asked the reason, Donati replied, “I keep those palettes above the easel as a record of colors, otherwise I forget them. Color is too important to depend on trial and error. I see a color on one of those palettes, put in on the picture in my mind’s eye, and this prevents me from making mistakes.” It is thus with meticulous care that Donati achieved the purity and vivacity of color, the apparent spontaneity which distinguish his paintings.

Donati's painting cannot be classified as belonging to a particular school of painting. Speaking of his artistic inspiration, he said, “I am not conscious of having imitated or been influenced by any one particular painter, but every painting contains the experiences of many previous painters. No artist can paint without being influenced by masters like Raphael, Michelangelo, Titian, and outside Italy by artists like Rembrandt and Renoir.” In fact, in certain of his larger paintings with their Madonna-like figures and extensive landscape backgrounds, you can see the influence of Italian Renaissance painting, both in particular motifs and in the monumentality of conception. But in each case the original inspiration served only as the starting point for a wholly new and creative work of art.

The subjects Donati preferred to paint reflect this personal style. Over the years he had worked on the same themes, transforming them with his own poetic vision. His most frequently recurring subjects, the nude, the still-life and the cityscape in part reflect his stylistic preference for rounded forms. “I paint the female form” he said, “not only because it is beautiful, but because it is basically round.” Another favorite subject is the cityscape, and again his taste for curved forms appeared in his choice of two domed churches, the Salute in Venice and Santo Spirito in Florence, both which he painted in innumerable versions in brilliant, vibrating colors.

The still-life was his third major theme. Time and again he drew his inspiration from a bowl of fruit, recreating it anew as his own style constantly developed and changed. With Donati, these few themes, which have recurred in the works of great masters in the history of painting, became in each case a new source of pleasure, a fresh way of seeing, and an insight into the creative vision of the artist.

Life 
Donati lived in the tradition of the great Florentine painters of the past who thought of painting as a profession like any other in which success depended on whether their work was liked by other people. So Lazzaro Donati himself worked in his studio creating, experimenting, changing, destroying the mistakes and hoping to sell the successes. Away from his studio he enjoyed an active social life. Warm-hearted and charming, he was equally at home at the ambassador's dinner table or at the trattoria in the square.

His talents were not limited to painting. He was also a sculptor and an excellent photographer who published two books of his photographs in the Famous Cities of the World Series on Venice and Florence. He also held a doctor's degree in economics from the University of Florence.

Although his painting was nourished by European culture and by the great traditions of the country in which he lives, Lazzaro Donati attained a distinct and coherent artistic personality. His paintings are essentially enjoyable. Some are poignant, some wistful, most are happy and all shimmer with light and color like some kind of translucent jewel.

References

External links 
 Christie's Auction Results 
 Facebook Fan Page 
 Mutual Art
 Art Price

1977 deaths
1926 births
20th-century Italian painters
20th-century Italian male artists
Italian male painters
Italian contemporary artists